Adam Henrique (born February 6, 1990) is a Canadian professional ice hockey centre and an alternate captain for the Anaheim Ducks of the National Hockey League (NHL). He was selected 82nd overall at the 2008 NHL Entry Draft by the New Jersey Devils. He played his Major Junior hockey for the Windsor Spitfires of the Ontario Hockey League (OHL) where he was a member of the team that won back-to-back Memorial Cups in 2009, and 2010.

Early life
Henrique was born in Brantford, Ontario, to Joe and Teresa Henrique, the second-oldest of four brothers. His father is Portuguese and his mother is Polish. His paternal grandparents speak Portuguese; his father also speaks some Portuguese, while his mother speaks Polish.

Joe Henrique farms 50 acres of tobacco and ginseng in Burford, Ontario, about 90 minutes southwest of Toronto.

Playing career

Junior
Henrique grew up in the small rural town of Burford, Ontario playing minor ice hockey for the Burford Coyotes of the Ontario Minor Hockey Association (OMHA) Southern Counties League. He played in the 2003 Quebec International Pee-Wee Hockey Tournament with the Brantford 99ers. He then graduated to the AAA Brantford 99ers of the Pavilion League where he played until Minor Midget in the 2005–06 season.

In May 2006, Henrique was selected in the second round, 24th overall, in the 2006 OHL Priority Selection by the Windsor Spitfires. He then went on to win the Memorial Cup with Windsor in both 2009 and in 2010. In 2014, his jersey number 14 was retired by the Spitfires.

Henrique was a member of the Gold Medal Team Ontario U-17 team at the Canada Winter Games in Whitehorse, Yukon, in February 2007. On the team, he was a teammate of eventual NHL first round draft selections Steven Stamkos, Alex Pietrangelo, Michael Del Zotto and Cody Hodgson. Henrique joined the 2008 NHL Entry Draft after graduating from Assumption College School in Brantford.

Professional

New Jersey Devils
On April 11, 2011, Henrique made his NHL debut for the Devils in a game against the Boston Bruins. He scored his first career NHL goal on November 3, 2011, against Sergei Bobrovsky of the Philadelphia Flyers. Two nights later, Henrique scored two breakaway goals against the Winnipeg Jets, the second goal being the game winner in overtime. With the absence of centre Travis Zajac due to injury, Henrique was matched up with wingers Zach Parise and Ilya Kovalchuk on the team's first line for a short time.

Henrique recorded his first career NHL fight on January 10, 2012, against the Calgary Flames. The same night, he also secured his first Gordie Howe hat trick (a goal, an assist and a fight in the same game). He fought Flames' captain Jarome Iginla in the first period and went on to record an assist and score a shorthanded goal in the second period. Iginla also recorded a Gordie Howe hat-trick in the game, with a goal and two assists in addition to his fight against Henrique.

Henrique was selected to compete in the NHL All-Star Rookie SuperSkills Competition in Ottawa on January 28, 2012. However, he did not participate due to a groin injury he received in a game against the Edmonton Oilers on January 11. He missed two games due to the injury and returned in a game against the Buffalo Sabres; he "tweaked" his groin again that night, initially causing him to withdraw from the competition. Rookie teammate Adam Larsson also pulled out of the Game due to wrist soreness. Henrique was replaced by New York Rangers left winger Carl Hagelin, while Larsson with Montreal Canadiens defenceman Raphael Diaz.

In the Eastern Conference Quarterfinals of the 2012 Stanley Cup playoffs, in Game 7 against the Florida Panthers, Henrique scored two goals, the latter being the double-overtime winner sending the Devils to the Conference Semifinals. In doing so, he became just the second rookie in League history to score an overtime-winning goal in a Game 7. On May 25, Henrique scored 1:03 into overtime to eliminate the New York Rangers and send the Devils to the 2012 Stanley Cup Finals. This made him the first rookie to score two series-clinching overtime goals in the same playoffs. At the end of the season, Henrique was one of the final three nominees for the Calder Memorial Trophy, awarded to the NHL's top rookie. The award, however, ultimately went to Gabriel Landeskog of the Colorado Avalanche.

On August 26, 2013, Henrique, as a restricted free agent, signed a six-year, $24 million contract with New Jersey.

During the 2015–16 season, Henrique scored a career-high 30 goals, almost doubling his previous season's total of 16. He also recorded a career-high 50 points, finishing second in team scoring only behind Kyle Palmieri.

On October 29, 2016, Henrique scored his 100th career goal in a home game against the Tampa Bay Lightning.

Anaheim Ducks
During the 2017–18 season, on November 30, 2017, Henrique was traded by the Devils, alongside Joseph Blandisi and a 2018 third-round pick to the Anaheim Ducks in exchange for Sami Vatanen and a conditional draft pick in 2019 or 2020. When Henrique faced his former team for the first time on December 18, he was given a tribute video and a tremendous ovation from Devils fans. Despite a 5–3 Devils win, Henrique managed to score a goal by lifting the puck past Devils (and former Ducks) defenceman Vatanen. On July 16, 2018, Henrique signed a five-year, $29.125 million contract extension with the Ducks.

International play

Henrique first played at the International stage for Canada at the 2010 World Junior Championships, in Saskatchewan, Canada. He helped the hosts claim the silver medal, registering 1 goal in 6 games.

On April 29, 2019, Henrique was named to the Team Canada roster to make his full international debut at the 2019 IIHF World Championship held in Slovakia. Henrique helped Canada progress through to the playoff rounds before losing the final to Finland to finish with the Silver Medal on May 26, 2019. He finished the tournament posting 2 assists in 10 appearances.

In 2021, Henrique was again named to the Team Canada roster for the 2021 IIHF World Championship held in Slovakia. Henrique had an outstanding tournament, with 6 goals and 11 points in 10 games. Team Canada this time won the gold medal, defeating Finland in the final.

Personal
Henrique married Lauren Thomas, the daughter of former NHL player Steve Thomas in 2021.

Career statistics

Regular season and playoffs

International

Awards and honours

References

External links

1990 births
Living people
Albany Devils players
Anaheim Ducks players
Canadian ice hockey centres
Canadian people of Polish descent
Canadian people of Portuguese descent
Ice hockey people from Ontario
New Jersey Devils draft picks
New Jersey Devils players
Sportspeople from Brantford
Sportspeople from the County of Brant
Windsor Spitfires players